The Tagalog Wikipedia is the Tagalog language edition of Wikipedia, which was launched on December 1, 2003.

History
The Tagalog Wikipedia was launched on December 1, 2003 as the first Wikipedia in a language of the Philippines.

As of February 3, 2011, it has more than 50,000 articles. Bantayan, Cebu became the 10,000th article on October 20, 2007, while Pasko sa Pilipinas (Christmas in the Philippines) became the 15,000th article on December 24, 2007. Localization of software messages through the Betawiki (or translatewiki.net) was finished on February 6, 2009.

In 2011, the Tagalog Wikipedia was part of the WikiHistories fellowship research project of the Wikimedia Foundation. The project tries to capture the triumphs, failures, and daily struggles of the editors working to make the dream of globally shared knowledge a reality.

Statistics
March 11, 2008: Pandaka pygmaea - 16,000th article
June 30, 2008: Silindro (Harmonica) - 17,000th article
August 5, 2008: Unang Aklat ng mga Macabeo (1 Maccabees) - 18,000th article
October 2, 2008: Heriyatriko (Geriatrics) - 19,000th article
November 1, 2008: Anak ng Tao (Son of man) - 20,000th article
March 22, 2010: Sky Girls - 25,000th article
July 20, 2010: Charlottenburg-Wilmersdorf - 30,000th article
October 25, 2010: 1714 Sy - 40,000th article
Nobyembre 9, 2010: Ekonometriks (Econometrics) - 45,000th article
January 15, 2011: Yu-Gi-Oh! Zexal - 50,000th article
February 4, 2013: Lalaking Vitruvio (Vitruvian Man) - 60,000th article

Due to the mass deletion of very short articles, as of July 2021, the total number of articles is below 50,000.

First steps of Tagalog Wikipedia
The first article created in the Tagalog Wikipedia (aside from Unang Pahina or the main page) is about Wikipedia. It was created on March 25, 2004. During the times when Tagalog Wikipedia's standards on articles were not strict, the first featured article was Livestrong wristband, but this was replaced by the article kimika (chemistry) in line with the revised standards. But kimika along with the second featured article wiki were eventually replaced by a review process. Technically, the very first featured article that survived the review process is about keso (cheese).

The File:Flutterbye.jpg was the first featured picture for the article paru-parong Viceroy (Viceroy butterfly). Because the file was deleted, it was replaced by File:St Vitus stained glass.jpg for the article Katedral ng San Vitus (St. Vitus Cathedral). Although the featured picture archive lists File:Viceroy Butterfly.jpg as the first featured picture.

The first three articles that appeared in Alam Ba Ninyo? (Did you know?) were web browser (en), Wikang Bulgaro (Bulgarian language) and Pilipinas (Philippines). There was a section entitled On This Day at the main page on April 2, 2008, but this was hidden on May 3, 2008, because of lack of contributors of this section.

Characteristics
The Tagalog Wikipedia has several characteristics which define it differently from other language editions of Wikipedia. According to Michael Tan, a Filipino anthropologist and Philippine Daily Inquirer columnist, the Tagalog Wikipedia greatly depends on the UP Diksyonaryong Filipino for basic definitions. Though focused on the Tagalog language, it has pages that helps non-Tagalog speakers on anything related about the online project.

Coverage
The Tagalog Wikipedia has significant coverage of topics related to the Philippines, as well as anime and manga-related topics. In 2010, GMA News and Public Affairs released a report criticizing the Tagalog Wikipedia's lack of science-related articles.

Project name
According to Wikipedians from the Tagalog and English Wikipedias, the Tagalog Wikipedia also represents the Filipino language. According to the Vibal Foundation, a foundation that started WikiPilipinas, the Tagalog Wikipedia is different from WikiFilipino, the wiki that they manage because WikiFilipino uses Filipino language while Tagalog Wikipedia uses Tagalog language. The difference or sameness of Tagalog and Filipino sparked a debate among Tagalog Wikipedians about the name of the project. This debate was mentioned in an article by DILA (Defenders of the Indigenous Languages of the Archipelago), an organization that defends indigenous languages of the Philippines.

Comparison with other Philippine-based language editions 
Compared to the other Philippine-based language editions of Wikipedia, it has significantly fewer articles than the Cebuano Wikipedia, which currently has more than  articles, and the Waray Wikipedia, which has more than  articles, as the majority of the articles in those two languages were initially created by the Lsjbot.

References

External links

 Wikipedias in Philippine languages

 Wikibooks in Philippine languages

 Wiktionaries in Philippine languages

Philippine Wikipedias (Incubator Status)
Aklan language (:incubator:Wp/akl)
Miraya Bikol language (:incubator:Wp/rbl)
Pandan Bikol language (:incubator:Wp/cts)
Rinconada Bikol language (:incubator:Wp/bto)
Capiznon language (:incubator:Wp/cps)
Hiligaynon language (:incubator:Wp/hil)
Kinaray-a language (:incubator:Wp/krj)
Maranao language (:incubator:Wp/mrw)
Tausug language (:incubator:Wp/tsg)

Philippine Wikimedia (Incubator Status)
Cebuano Wiktionary
Kapampangan Wiktionary
Pangasinan Wiktionary
Tagalog Wikinews
Tagalog Wikivoyage
Waray Wiktionary

Philippine encyclopedias
Wikipedias by language
Internet properties established in 2003
Tagalog-language websites